Maciej Sochal is a Polish Paralympic athlete competing in club throw and shot put events. He represented Poland at the Summer Paralympics in 2004, 2012, 2016 and 2021. He won the gold medal in the men's club throw F32 event at the 2016 Summer Paralympics.

He qualified to represent Poland at the 2020 Summer Paralympics in Tokyo, Japan after winning the bronze medal in the men's club throw F32 event at the 2019 World Para Athletics Championships held in Dubai, United Arab Emirates.

References

External links 
 

Living people
Year of birth missing (living people)
Place of birth missing (living people)
Athletes (track and field) at the 2004 Summer Paralympics
Athletes (track and field) at the 2012 Summer Paralympics
Athletes (track and field) at the 2016 Summer Paralympics
Athletes (track and field) at the 2020 Summer Paralympics
Medalists at the 2016 Summer Paralympics
Paralympic gold medalists for Poland
Polish male shot putters
Polish club throwers
Paralympic athletes of Poland
Male club throwers
Paralympic medalists in athletics (track and field)
Wheelchair shot putters
Paralympic shot putters
Paralympic club throwers
21st-century Polish people